Schuylkill Haven High School is a small rural public high school located at 120 Haven Street in Schuylkill Haven, Pennsylvania. It is the sole high school operated by Schuylkill Haven Area School District. As of the 2021–2022 school year, enrollment was 467 students in eighth through twelfth grades with 36.5 teachers on a full-time employment basis for a student-teacher ratio of 12.79, according to National Center for Education Statistics data. 

Schuylkill Haven High School students may choose to attend the Schuylkill Technology Center for training in: practical nursing; the construction and mechanical trades, as well as other careers. The Schuylkill Intermediate Unit IU29 provides the school with a wide variety of services, including specialized education for disabled students, state mandated training on recognizing and reporting child abuse, speech and visual disability services, and criminal background check processing for prospective employees and professional development for staff and faculty. Schuylkill Haven does not participate in its online credit recovery program.

Extracurriculars
Schuylkill Haven Area School District offers a wide variety of clubs, activities and sports teams. The district operates an indoor swimming pool and has had an artificial turf football field since 2006.

Athletics
Varsity

Boys
Baseball - AA
Basketball - AA
Cross country - A
Football - AA
Soccer - A
Swimming and diving - AA
Track and field - AA
Wrestling - AA

Girls
Basketball - AAA
Cross country - A
Soccer - A
Softball - AA
Swimming and diving - AA
Track and field - AA
Volleyball - AA

According to PIAA directory July 2016

References

External links
Official website

Public high schools in Pennsylvania
Schools in Schuylkill County, Pennsylvania